San Luis Jilotepeque is a town, with a population of 11,675 (2018 census), and a municipality in the Jalapa department of Guatemala. The municipality has a population of 24,679 (2018 census), and cover an area of 209 km2.

References 

Municipalities of the Jalapa Department